In linguistics, a pro-form is a type of function word or expression that stands in for (expresses the same content as) another word, phrase, clause or sentence where the meaning is recoverable from the context. They are used either to avoid repetitive expressions or in quantification (limiting the variables of a proposition).

Pro-forms are divided into several categories, according to which part of speech they substitute:
 A pronoun substitutes a noun or a noun phrase, with or without a determiner: it, this.
 A pro-adjective substitutes an adjective or a phrase that functions as an adjective: so as in "It is less so than we had expected."
 A pro-adverb substitutes an adverb or a phrase that functions as an adverb: how or this way.
 A pro-verb substitutes a verb or a verb phrase: do, as in: "I will go to the party if you do".
 A prop-word: one, as in "the blue one"
 A pro-sentence substitutes an entire sentence or subsentence: Yes, or that as in "That is true".

An interrogative pro-form is a pro-form that denotes the (unknown) item in question and may itself fall into any of the above categories.

The rules governing allowable syntactic relations between certain pro-forms (notably personal and reflexive/reciprocal pronouns) and their antecedents have been studied in what is called binding theory.

Table of correlatives
Some 19th-century grammars of Latin, such as Raphael Kühner's 1844 grammar, organized non-personal pronouns (interrogative, demonstrative, indefinite/quantifier, relative) in a table of "correlative" pronouns due to their similarities in morphological derivation and their syntactic relationships (as correlative pairs) in that language. Later that century, L. L. Zamenhof, the inventor of Esperanto, made use of the concept to systematically create the pro-forms and determiners of Esperanto in a regular table of correlatives. The table of correlatives for English follows.

Some languages may have more categories.  See demonstrative.

Note that some categories are regular and some are not.  They may be regular or irregular also depending on languages.  The following chart shows comparison between English, French (irregular) and Japanese (regular):

(Note that "daremo", "nanimo" and "dokomo" are universal quantifiers with positive verbs.)

Some languages do not distinguish interrogative and indefinite pro-forms.  In Mandarin, "Shéi yǒu wèntí?" means either "Who has a question?" or "Does anyone have a question?", depending on context.

See also

References

External links

SIL Glossary of Linguistic Terms: Pro-Adverb

Parts of speech